Mykolas Romeris University is an international university located with campuses in Vilnius and Kaunas, Lithuania.

MRU cooperates closely with over 350 universities, public and private institutions, takes part in academic, professional and inter-sectorial networks. MRU has a full membership of the following international higher education organizations: International Association of Universities, European University Association, European Association for International Education, European-Asian Knowledge Consortium Social Technologies for Smart and Inclusive Society, etc.

Currently MRU enrolls 7500 students including 600 international students and employs over 400 academic staff. The university offers doctoral, Master's and Bachelor's Degree study programmes. Over 80% of them have international accreditation. The most popular study programmes are law, management, psychology, social work, public security, etc. About 200 doctoral students study in the fields of law, management, psychology, philology, economics, and educational science.

MRU is structured within the Law School, Faculty of Public Governance and Business, Faculty of Human and Social Studies and Public Security Academy. Research and innovation is implemented at the Social Innovations Laboratory Network MRU LAB that includes 16 laboratories and the Research and Innovation Support Centre.

The university is named after Mykolas Romeris, a Lithuanian lawyer, scientist, and politician.

History 

 October 28, 2004, the Seimas of the Republic of Lithuania approved a resolution (No. IX-2515) "Changing the Name of the Law University of Lithuania and Approval of the Statute of Mykolas Romeris University.
  December 16, 2004, the Senate of Mykolas Romeris University unanimously approved Professor Alvydas Pumputis as Rector (Resolution No. 1SN-9).
  July 23, 2009, the Seimas of the Republic of Lithuania by Resolution No. XI-411 approved the new Statute of Mykolas Romeris University.
  According to the July 23, 2009 Resolution Nr. XI-411 of the Seimas of the Republic of Lithuania, which approved the Statute of Mykolas Romeris University and the Resolution of Mykolas Romeris University's Senate of October 6, 2009, (No. 1SN-10), the state higher education and studies budgetary institution Mykolas Romeris University was reorganized into the state higher education public institution Mykolas Romeris University.
  April 29, 2015, Mykolas Romeris University's (MRU) new Rector Assoc. Prof. Algirdas Monkevičius was inducted in a ceremony on campus. From January 15, 2019 Assoc. Prof. Algirdas Monkevičius was appointed   for the Minister of Education, Science and Sport.
  March 14, 2019, Mykolas Romeris University's (MRU) Council voted to approve MRU Law School's Private Law Institute Prof. Dr. Inga Žalėnienė as the University's new Rector. Žalėnienė was appointed to a 5-year term.

Structure 

The founder of the university is Seimas of the Republic of Lithuania.

The management bodies of the university are University Council, the University Senate and the University Rector.

Mykolas Romeris University consists of: 4 faculties, Mykolas Romeris Law School and Public Security Academy. It offers more than 90 programmes at the Bachelor's, Master's, and Doctoral levels in Lithuanian and English languages. Studies are carried out in compliance to the major principles of Bologna process. The major fields of study are Business, Communication, Economics, Educology, Finance, History, Management, Informatics, Law, Management, Philology, Philosophy, Political Sciences, Psychology, Public Administration, Public Security, Social Work, and Sociology.

Faculties 

 Faculty of Human and Social Sciences
 Faculty of Public Governance and Business 
 Public Security Academy
 Mykolas Romeris Law School

Administration units 

 Academic Affairs Centre
 Career Centre
 Digital Studies Unit
 Qualification Improvement and Recognition of Competencies Department
 Library
 Research and Innovation Support Centre
 Research Quality and Analysis Office
 Social Innovations Doctoral School
 Research Communication Division
 Knowledge and Technologies Transfer Office
 Projects Office
 International Office
 Asian Centre
Asian Centre MRU was established in April 2013 and it focuses on cooperation with Japan, South Korea, China and India. It also offers Korean, Chinese and Japanese language courses free of charge.
 King Sejong Institute
Vilnius King Sejong Institute (KSI) at MRU promotes cultural understanding Lithuania - S. Korea through Korean language, culture, economics and politics courses. KSI teaches Korean language and culture to foreigners who want to learn Korean as a second language or a foreign language.
 Francophone Studies Centre
 Chancellery Office
 Document Office
 Legal Office
 Personnel Office
 Artistic Education Centre
 Property Management Office
 Building Management and Maintenance Division
 Service Unit
 IT Centre
 Health and Sports Centre

Studies 

Mykolas Romeris University offers the possibility to choose international joint study programmes leading to double diplomas. Joint programmes are offered in cooperation with Universities from France, Austria, Finland, even South Korea.

About 500 University students each year participate in international exchange (studies and internships) via Erasmus, Nordplus or other international programmes.

A Lithuanian degree diploma is recognized in all the countries which have signed the Lisbon Convention - signed by 50 countries and international organizations. That means students can be sure that their qualifications gained in Lithuania will be valid in all these countries.

Research 
MRU carries out fundamental and applied research, takes part in national and international research programmes and projects, engages in contracted research, implements Ph.D. studies, organizes academic and mobility events, and widely disseminates research results. MRU research and innovation is carried out in the framework of the interdisciplinary priority research area Social Innovations for Global Growth and 5 research programmes:
Justice, Security and Human Rights;
Social Technologies;
Sustainable Growth in the Context of Globalization;
Improving the Quality of Life and Advancing Employment Opportunities;
Continuity and Change of Values in Global Society.
Each year MRU organizes over 100 academic events: conferences, seminars, workshops, trainings, etc.

Since 2013 aiming to popularize interdisciplinary research results and involve society in research processes, a cycle of public lectures Research Café were carried out attracting researchers, students, partners and other stakeholders. For example, past Research Café events in the area of energy include Management of Renewable Energy Resources (leader - assoc. prof. dr. A.Stasiukynas), Does Lithuania need a Nuclear Power Plant? (leader - prof. dr. D. Štreimiekienė),

Educational events targeted at different groups of society also take place at the university. For example, such events as Test the Profession, Become a Student for One Day or 10 MRU academies targeted at high school students could also be mentioned. Summer schools can serve as another vehicle of science communication. The most significant annual summer schools include Transparency School (held in partnership with Transparency International), International School on Human Rights (held in partnership with French, German, British, Polish, Italian universities, co-funded by the Europe for Citizens Programme of the European Union), Science and Art of Communication, etc. Saturday schools as for instance, Mediation School, attracting numerous members of the society has been organized at MRU.

Internationalization 

International cooperation at MRU is oriented to strengthen internationalization in studies and research. In partnership with other institutions, joint study programmes are created. Students, academics and administrative personnel participate in exchange programmes, international conferences and other events. The University's international ties span all the regions of the globe. It has affiliations with more than 400 foreign academic and state institutions. From 2006, the University offers joint master's degree study programmes and encourages its students to attain double or triple diplomas. One of the goals of University's internationalization is student diversification, thus the number of international students is continually growing. This enables both Lithuanian and international students to share experiences and ideas as well as to work together on joint international projects, expanding their world views and cultural awareness.

Currently MRU has over 700 of international students with majority of students coming from Ukraine, Turkey, France, Germany, Italy, Spain.
Every semester number of International degree seeking students and exchange students (under Erasmus+ and bilateral agreements) is growing.

Campus 
MRU's Central Campus is located in the Northern part of Vilnius, surrounded by the park:
 It takes approximately 25 minutes to reach city center by bus. 
 Accommodation on campus is offered for all international students, in a triple or double room.
 University offers dining hall and cafeterias where it is possible to have breakfast, lunch or dinner.
 University Library and lecture halls are located 5 minutes' walk from Students House.

Sports 

Mykolas Romeris University's students are encouraged to engage in an active lifestyle on campus through organized activities and individual health promotion. New athletic halls for gymnastics, games and table tennis have been set up.
 MRU was a partner of EuroBasket 2011, holding practices of all the top 8 teams.
 Mykolas Romeris University has been cultivating the Olympic spirit for a long time, and as a proof of that on December 1, 2010, the Lithuanian National Olympic Committee (LNOC) awarded the Rector of Mykolas Romeris University, Prof. Dr. Alvydas Pumputis, with LNOC's Honorary Medal for the University's contribution to sports. Artūras Poviliūnas, the President of Lithuanian National Olympic Committee, said that athletes at this University have the best study conditions, which highly contribute to their possibilities for reaching Olympic heights.

Olympic medallists 
 2016 Summer Olympics in Rio de Janeiro: MRU students Mindaugas Griškonis and Saulius Ritter won a silver medal in the Rowing Men's Double Sculls.
 2012 Summer Olympics in London: MRU alumni Laura Asadauskaitė-Zadneprovskienė won a gold medal in pentathlon, MRU student Jevgenij Šuklin won a silver medal in the Men's Canoe Single's Finals 200 m event.
 2008 Summer Olympics in Beijing: MRU students Edvinas Krungolcas and Andrejus Zadneprovskis were silver and bronze medal in pentathlon.
 2004 Summer Olympics in Athens: MRU student Andrejus Zadneprovskis won a silver medal in pentathlon.

Other athletes 
 MRU student Giedrius Titenis is a two-time Olympic swimmer, who won a bronze medal in the 2009 World Aquatics Championship.
 MRU student Andrej Olijnik participated in the 2016 Olympics, and won a silver medal in the 2011 ICF Canoe Sprint World Championships.

References

External links 

  University Website
  European Commission Joint Research Center

Mykolas Romeris University
Educational institutions established in 2004
Law schools in Lithuania
2004 establishments in Lithuania